Mahmudabad (also Romanized as Maḩmūdābād) is a village in Mahmudabad Rural District, in the Central District of Isfahan County, Isfahan Province, Iran. At the 2006 census, its population was 4,811, in 1,197 families.

References 

Populated places in Isfahan County